Polyommatus australorossicus, the South-Russian blue, is a butterfly species in the family Lycaenidae. It was described by Vladimir A. Lukhtanov and Alexander V. Dantchenko in 2017 and is found in southern Russia in the Caucasus Mountains.

References

Butterflies described in 2017
Polyommatus
Insects of Russia
Butterflies of Asia